Charles Borgeaud (1861 – 1940) was a Swiss historian and jurist.

He was nominated for the Nobel Prize in Literature in 1901.

References 

People from the canton of Vaud
1861 births
1940 deaths
19th-century Swiss historians
Swiss jurists
University of Jena alumni
Academic staff of the University of Geneva
Corresponding Fellows of the British Academy
Date of birth missing
Place of birth missing
Date of death missing
Place of death missing
20th-century Swiss historians